Vitalie Manaliu (born 23 March 1985 in Chișinău) is a Moldovan professional football player. As of 2009, he plays for FC Iskra-Stal Rîbniţa.

References

External links
 

1985 births
Living people
Moldovan footballers
Moldova international footballers
FC Zimbru Chișinău players
Association football forwards